Conquest Hospital is a National Health Service hospital in St Leonards-on-Sea in Hastings in East Sussex, England. It is managed by the East Sussex Healthcare NHS Trust.

History
The laying of the foundation stone for the hospital was commemorated when Kenneth Clarke, Minister of Health unveiled a plaque on the site in 1988. The new facility, which was built by Cementation, was intended to consolidate services previously provided by the Eversfield Hospital in St Leonards, the Buchanan Hospital in Hastings, the St Helens Hospital in Hastings and the Royal East Sussex Hospital in Hastings. The new hospital was fully available to patients by 1992 and it was officially opened by the Princess Royal in February 1993. The Princess Royal also opened the second phase of the hospital in July 1997.

The radiology facilities were comprehensively upgraded in 2015.

See also
 Healthcare in Sussex
 List of hospitals in England

References

Hospital buildings completed in 1992
Hospital buildings completed in 1997
Buildings and structures in Hastings
Hospitals in East Sussex
NHS hospitals in England